Centuri, formerly known as Allied Leisure, was an American arcade game manufacturer. They were based in Hialeah, Florida, and were one of the top six suppliers of coin-operated arcade video game machinery in the United States during the early 1980s. Centuri in its modern inception was formed when former Taito of America president Ed Miller and his partner Bill Olliges took over Allied Leisure, Inc. They renamed it "Centuri" in 1980.

Many of the video game machines distributed in the US under the Centuri name were licensed from overseas manufacturers, particularly Japanese developers such as Konami. Allied Leisure previously also manufactured pinball and electro-mechanical games, which were developed in-house. The company's vice president was Joel Hochberg from about 1976 to 1982, before he went on to work for Rare.

Centuri had a close relationship with Konami, which licensed the North American rights of their games to Centuri during the early 1980s. This led to Konami acquiring 5% of Centuri's stocks in 1983, with Konami founder Kagemasa Kōzuki announcing he would become a director at Centuri. Centuri discontinued their video game operations in January 1985.

List of games
Allied Leisure and Centuri published the following arcade games in the United States:

Pinball and electro-mechanical games released as Allied Leisure (1969-1979)
 Monkey Bizz (1969)
 Unscramble (1969)
 Wild Cycle (1970)
 Sea Hunt (1972)
 Spooksville (1972)
 Crack Shot (1972)
 Monte Carlo (1973)
 Chopper (1974)
 Super Shifter (1974)
 F-114 (1975)
 Dyn O' Mite (1975; solid-state pinball machine)
 Daytona 500 (1976)
 Take Five (1978; cocktail pinball)
 Clay Champ (1979; licensed from Namco)
 Star Shooter (1979; cocktail pinball)

Arcade video games released as Allied Leisure (1973-1979)
 Paddle Battle (1973), a Pong-style game
 Super Soccer (1973), a Pong-style game, sold 5,000 arcade cabinets, among top 5 best-selling arcade video games of 1973.
 Tennis Tourney (1973), Pong-style game, sold 5,000 cabinets, among top 5 best-selling arcade video games of 1973.
 Fire Power (1975)
 Bomac (1976)
 Chase (1976)
 Battle Station (1977)
 Battlestar (1979; unreleased?)
 Lunar Invasion (1979; unreleased?)
 Space Bug (1979; unreleased?)
 Clay Shoot (1979; video game version of Clay Champ)

Arcade video games released as Centuri (1980-1984)
 Rip-Off (1980; color cocktail version licensed from Cinematronics)
 Targ (1980; cocktail version licensed from Exidy)
 Eagle (1980; developed by Nichibutsu as Moon Cresta)
 Killer Comet (1980; developed in-house; licensed to Game Plan)
 Megatack (1980; developed in-house; licensed to Game Plan)
 Phoenix (1980; developed by a "smaller Japanese developer" such as Hiraoka or TPN); licensors: Hiraoka and Amstar Electronics
 Route 16 (1981; developed by Sun Electronics); licensor: Tehkan
 Pleiades (1981; developed by Tehkan)
 Round-Up (1981; developed by Taito and Hiraoka); licensor: Hiraoka & Co.
 The Pit (1981; developed by AW Electronics); licensor: Zilec
 Vanguard (1981; developed by TOSE); licensor: SNK
 Challenger (1981; developed in-house)
 D-Day (1982; developed by Olympia)
 Locomotion (1982; developed by Konami)
 Swimmer (1982; developed by Tehkan)
 Time Pilot (1982; developed by Konami)
 Tunnel Hunt (1982; developed by Atari)
 Aztarac (1983; developed in-house)
 Gyruss (1983; developed by Konami)
 Guzzler (1983; developed by Tehkan)
 Track & Field (1983; developed by Konami)
 Munch Mobile (1983; developed by SNK)
 Circus Charlie (1984; developed by Konami)
 Hyper Sports (1984; developed by Konami)
 Mikie: High School Graffiti (1984; developed by Konami)
 Badlands (1984; developed by Konami)

References

  "Financial Desk: Company Briefs", The New York Times, January 17, 1985. (subscription required).  "Centuri Inc., Hialeah, Fla., said it would discontinue operations of its video games division and close its National Interport Services Inc. boat repair facility in Hampton, Va., resulting in a $2.5 million charge against 1984 results."

External links
 Killer List of Videogame's entry on Centuri.
 The Centuri Arcade Database

Defunct video game companies of the United States
Video game companies disestablished in 1985
Video game publishers
Defunct companies based in Florida
Companies based in Hialeah, Florida